Emmanuel Brugvin (born 14 December 1970 in Nantes) is a French slalom canoeist who competed from the mid-1980s to the mid-2000s (decade). He won four medals at the ICF Canoe Slalom World Championships with a gold (C1: 1999), two silvers (C1 team: 1991, 2003), and a bronze (C1 team: 1999).

Brugvin also competed in three Summer Olympics, earning his best finish of fourth in the C1 event in Sydney in 2000.

World Cup individual podiums

References

1970 births
Canoeists at the 1992 Summer Olympics
Canoeists at the 1996 Summer Olympics
Canoeists at the 2000 Summer Olympics
French male canoeists
Living people
Olympic canoeists of France
Medalists at the ICF Canoe Slalom World Championships